was a Japanese football player. He played for Japan national team.

National team career
Naoki was born on March 23, 1918. On June 16, 1940, when he was a Tokyo Imperial University student, he debuted for Japan national team against Philippines and Japan won the match. This match was the first match since 1936 Summer Olympics and the only match in the 1940s in Japan's International A Match due to World War II. Naoki died in an accident immediately after World War II.

National team statistics

References

External links
 
 Japan National Football Team Database

1918 births
1940s deaths
Year of death uncertain
Japan international footballers
Japanese footballers
University of Tokyo alumni
Association football forwards
Accidental deaths in Japan